Warren County is a county in the U.S. state of New York. As of the 2020 census, the population was 65,737. The county seat is Queensbury. The county was established in 1813 and is named in honor of General Joseph Warren, an American Revolutionary War hero of the Battle of Bunker Hill.

Warren County is part of the Glens Falls, NY Metropolitan Statistical Area, which is also included in the Albany-Schenectady, NY Combined Statistical Area.

History

When counties were established in the Province of New York in 1683, the present Warren County was part of Albany County. The county was enormous, covering the northern part of New York State, all of the present State of Vermont, and, in theory, extended westward to the Pacific Ocean. It was reduced in size on July 3, 1766, by the creation of Cumberland County, and further on March 16, 1770, by the creation of Gloucester County, both containing territory now in Vermont. On March 12, 1772, what was left of Albany County was split into three parts, one remaining under the name Albany County. One of the other pieces, Charlotte County (named for the British queen Charlotte of Mecklenburg-Strelitz), contained the eastern portion.

In 1778, the name Charlotte County was changed to Washington County to honor George Washington, the American Revolutionary War general and later President of the United States of America.

In 1788, Washington County was reduced in size by the splitting-off of Clinton County. This was a much larger area than the present Clinton County, including several other counties or county parts of the present New York State. Washington County was slightly enlarged by the transfer of the Town of Cambridge from Albany County to Washington County in 1791.

In 1813, Warren County was split off from Washington County, receiving its name in honor of General Joseph Warren. County officials first met in the Lake George Coffee House in the hamlet of Caldwell (known today as Lake George Village). James Caldwell, a patenee of the Town of Caldwell, donated land within the hamlet to serve as the county seat beginning in 1819.

Lake George is the site of a YMCA conference center, the Silver Bay YMCA, founded in 1900 and one of only a few of its type in the United States . The Silver Bay Inn was built in 1904 and is on the National Register of Historic Places.

In 1963, the courthouse in Lake George village was closed and operations moved several miles south to its present-day location at the Warren County Municipal Center main campus in Queensbury.

Geography

Warren County is situated in the eastern portion of New York State in the Adirondack Mountains. The eastern border is Washington County. It is typically included as the northern part of the Capital District although it is sometimes included as part of the North Country.

Adjacent counties
 Essex County - north
 Washington County - east
 Saratoga County - south
 Hamilton County - west

Climate
The climate of Warren County is humid continental, as is most of New York State. In the winter, bouts of cold, dry air arrive from Canada, and interior sections of North America. In the summer, the Gulf Stream can bring days of hot, moist, humid air to the county. Extratropical storms often affect the county; in the winter, Nor'easters bring heavy snow and rain, and sometimes high wind. Fall and spring are generally relatively mild and pleasant, with fall foliage regarded as some of the most stunning in the country.  In the summer and fall, back door cold fronts move in from the north and bring thunderstorms, sometimes severe.

Government and politics

|}

Warren County has been heavily supportive of Republican candidates since the Civil War. The Republicans currently hold 16 of 20 seats on the county legislature, and George W. Bush won the county with 55% of the vote in 2004. Both of Warren County's representatives in the state legislature, Elizabeth O'C. Little in the Senate and Teresa Sayward in the Assembly are Republicans. Currently Republicans constitute 51% of registered voters in Warren County, while Democrats account for 23%.

Democrats have been steadily making inroads in recent years; Senator Charles Schumer won the county by 56% in his re-election bid in 2004, and the Democrats recently gained a majority on the Glens Falls City Council. John Hall, a Democrat, picked up the county judgeship position in 2003. In 2006 Republican John E. Sweeney was unseated in the district by Kirsten Gillibrand as Member of Congress. In 2009 Congresswoman Kirsten Gillibrand was selected by Governor David Paterson to replace Hillary Clinton as New York's junior Senator.  Democrat Scott Murphy was elected to replace Gillibrand in a special election for the NY 20th congressional district.

In the 2008 presidential election, Barack Obama narrowly carried Warren County over John McCain, with Obama receiving 16,281 votes countywide to McCain's total of 15,424 votes. This was only the second time since 1964 that Warren County had voted for the Democratic nominee, the other being 1996, when Bill Clinton won with a plurality. In 2012, Obama won again by a similar margin over Republican nominee Mitt Romney. In 2016, Donald Trump flipped the county back to the Republicans, with an 8.5 percent margin of victory over Democratic nominee Hillary Clinton. In 2020, Warren County voted for Trump again by a very narrow margin of just 57 votes, despite moving 8 points towards the Democratic ticket of former Vice President Joe Biden and junior California senator Kamala Harris. Warren is one of six New York counties that Trump won by less than 500 votes.

Warren County has 20 county supervisors, which represent 11 of the county's towns and the City of Glens Falls:
 Bolton: Ronald F. Conover
 Chester: Craig R. Leggett
 Glens Falls
 Ward 1: Jack Diamond
 Ward 2: Peter V. McDevitt
 Ward 3: Claudia Knudsen Braymer
 Ward 4: Daniel Bruno
 Ward 5: Bennett F. Driscoll Jr.
 Hague: Edna A. Frasier
 Horicon: Matthew Simpson
 Johnsburg: Andrea Hogan
 Lake George: Dennis L. Dickinson
 Lake Luzerne: Eugene J. Merlino
 Queensbury
 County:
 Michael Wild
 Douglas Beaty
 Brad Magowan
 Rachel Seeber
 Town: John Strough
 Stony Creek: Frank E. Thomas
 Thurman: Susan Shepler
 Warrensburg: Kevin Geraghty

The board of supervisors control weighted votes for county matters, based on the population of the towns they represent, with the Queensbury Town Supervisor and county supervisors having the largest number of votes on the board.

The current Warren County sheriff is James LaFarr. The sheriff's office is structured around three divisions; Administrative Services, Law Enforcement and Correction. The Law Enforcement Division includes both Investigative Services, Patrol Services and the Communications Center.  Patrol Services have specialized units that operate under the control of the Division Commander. The sheriff's office provides boat patrols on Lake George and Schroon Lake.

Demographics

As of the census of 2000, there were 63,303 people, 25,726 households, and 17,056 families residing in the county.  The population density was 73 people per square mile (28/km2).  There were 34,852 housing units at an average density of 40 per square mile (15/km2).  The racial makeup of the county was 97.48% White, 0.62% Black or African American, 0.21% Native American, 0.55% Asian, 0.01% Pacific Islander, 0.23% from other races, and 0.91% from two or more races.  Hispanic or Latino of any race were 1.05% of the population. 17.9% were of Irish, 12.7% English, 11.4% Italian, 11.1% French, 10.6% German and 9.0% American ancestry according to Census 2000. 96.3% spoke English, 1.4% Spanish and 1.0% French as their first language.

There were 25,726 households, out of which 30.70% had children under the age of 18 living with them, 51.90% were married couples living together, 10.40% had a female householder with no husband present, and 33.70% were non-families. 27.30% of all households were made up of individuals, and 11.30% had someone living alone who was 65 years of age or older.  The average household size was 2.41 and the average family size was 2.93.

In the county, the population was spread out, with 24.00% under the age of 18, 7.50% from 18 to 24, 28.20% from 25 to 44, 25.10% from 45 to 64, and 15.20% who were 65 years of age or older. The median age was 39 years. For every 100 females there were 94.20 males. For every 100 females age 18 and over, there were 91.00 males.

The median income for a household in the county was $39,198, and the median income for a family was $46,793. Males had a median income of $32,922 versus $22,279 for females. The per capita income for the county was $20,727. About 7.20% of families and 9.70% of the population were below the poverty line, including 14.10% of those under age 18 and 5.90% of those age 65 or over.

2020 Census

Economy
Throughout the county, annual retail sales totals up to $1,010,937,000. General merchandise sales is $101,762,000. Apparel store's annual sales are $98,221,000 while annual food sales is $162,890,000. Health and drug store sales total up to $44,841,000.

The county contains the highest concentrated area of medical manufacturers in New York state, with many medical inventions originating in the county. Norman Jekyll and David Sheridan introduced the medical device industry to the Glens Falls area. In the 1940s, they produced products that were from materials supplied by war-torn Europe. One of the primary manufacturers is AngioDynamics Inc., which is located in Queensbury, and is a producer of  medical devices used in minimally invasive, image-guided procedures to treat peripheral vascular disease. Another major manufacturer of medical devices is Boston Scientific Corp., which is located in Glens Falls.

Education
In Warren County, there are 16 public elementary schools, with the largest being the Queensbury Elementary School, serving 1,150 students and the smallest being the Abraham Wing School, serving 146 students. There are nine middle schools, with the largest being Queensbury Middle School, serving 945 students and the smallest being the Bolton Central School, serving 285 students. There are also 11 high schools, with the largest being the Queensbury Senior High School, serving 1,301 students, and the smallest being the Bolton Central School, serving 285 students. In addition, there is one major private secondary school: the St. Mary's - St. Alphonsus Regional Catholic School, which is located in Glens Falls.

SUNY Adirondack is the site of post-secondary education in Warren County. Located in Queensbury, the college provides an extensive program of degrees and certificate programs. SUNY Plattsburgh, based in Clinton County, offers bachelor and master-degree programs at the SUNY Adirondack campus.

Healthcare
The primary healthcare center in Warren County is the Glens Falls Hospital, which is located in Glens Falls. Providing 410 beds, its most common procedure is miscellaneous diagnostic and therapeutic procedures.

Transportation

Bus
Regular bus service from Queensbury to Glens Falls is provided by the Greater Glens Falls Transit System. These also include trolleys that run on the road. The trolleys go from Bolton Landing (four times a day) and usually turn around just north of Hearthstone Point Campground on Route 9N.

Roads

The only U.S. Route is U.S. Route 9, which traverses the eastern portion of the county. The only interstate is Interstate 87, also known as the Adirondack Northway.

South of Lake George Village

Only New York State Route 9N traverses the Lake Luzerne region of Warren County. There are two state-maintained routes in Glens Falls: Route 9L, which terminates in the city, while the second is New York State Route 32, which leaves Warren for Washington County, where it terminates at New York State Route 196. Also, on the eastern side of the city, there is County Route 79 (Boulevard), a former alignment of NY 32. There is also New York State Route 254, a  road in southern part of the town and enters Washington County as well. The third and final state maintained route is New York State Route 9L, which traverses down the central portion of the town. Several county routes traverse through Stony Creek. These include County Route 3, County Route 12, County Route 22, and County Route 76.

Lake George Village
There are several major routes in the town and village of Lake George. There is New York State Route 9N, which traverses north to south through the county. There is also County Routes 6 (Fort George Boulevard) and 59 (Bloody Pond Road). The latter is a continuation of New York State Route 9L and heads to terminate in Queensbury. In this town includes New York State Route 912Q, which is the Exit 22 connector/park & ride on the Northway.

North of Lake George Village

Although the region for Bolton and Bolton Landing is large, there is only one state-maintained route, Route 9N, and there is County Route 11 (Bolton-Riverbank Road), which is a connector to Exit 24 on the Northway. Only two county or higher-level maintained roads traverse the hamlet of Diamond Point, Route 9N and County Route 35 (Diamond Point Road), which connects 9N to the Northway (Exit 23) and U.S. Route 9 in Warrensburg. New York State Route 8 enters the county at Johnsburg, entering into the Town of Chester, where it merges with U.S. Route 9 for almost four miles, splitting off at the Landon Hill/Route 8/Route 9 intersection. New York State Route 8 terminates at an intersection with New York State Route 9N in the center of Hague. There are several state-maintained and county-maintained roads in the Warrensburg area. These include the termini of both New York State Route 28 and New York State Route 418 at US 9. There are also a few county routes, including County Route 4 in Athol and County Route 10 (Horicon Road) in Warrensburg. Route 10 continues eastward, terminating in Bolton Landing.

Trains
Amtrak serves the station via its Adirondack and Ethan Allen Express daily routes, which allow easy access to Montréal, Albany, New York City, and Rutland, Vermont, among many other towns and cities.

Airport
Floyd Bennett Memorial Airport (FAA: GFL) is a county-owned, public-use airport located 3 nautical miles (6 km) northeast of Glens Falls, in the Town of Queensbury.

Arts and culture
Warren County is home to several music centers, including the Luzerne Music Center, which is a summer camp focused on teaching music, in the foothills of the Adirondacks. In July, it holds an annual Chamber Music Festival which is open for public viewing. The Upper Hudson Musical Arts is also a popular attraction, bringing concerts by professional chamber music ensembles and soloists to the Adirondacks throughout the year. Concerts are held at the Tannery Pond Community Center in North Creek. In addition, the Charles R. Wood Theater home to Adirondack Theatre Festival is a year-round professional theater in Glens Falls.

In Warren County, New York on Lake George at Bolton Landing, Golden Heart Farm art colony the summer residence of Thomas and Wilhelmina Weber Furlong of the Art Students League of New York opened in the summer of 1921. The historically important art colony and artists in residence program were at the center of the American modernist movement as important artists like David Smith, John Graham, and Dorothy Dehner from Manhattan traveled to Warren County to escape the city and study with the couple. A New York State historic marker was placed for the Warren County Bicentennial honoring Weber Furlong On July 23, 2013, at City Hall in Glens Falls.

Points of interest

Lake George

Warren County is the primary area of tourism related to Lake George. Lake George is a  lake located in the Adirondack Mountains. Popular activities on the lake include river tubing, swimming, kayaking and boating. There are several large points of interest in the Lake George region. These include Prospect Mountain just outside town, Steel Pier along Beach Road which serves several tour boats. The village is a popular tourist spot and is home to many stores and novelty shops. There is the Lake George Battleground on the edge of the village along County Route 6.

To the north, there are several hotels and motels to serve tourists visiting the lake. There are several campgrounds around the region including Hearthstone Point on Route 9N and Lake George Battleground south of the village. There are also several campgrounds on islands on the lake. These include Long Island, which serves 88 campsites. All island campgrounds and land-locked grounds are maintained by the New York Department of Environmental Conservation.

Historic sites

One of the premiere historic sites in Warren County is the Fredella, Joseph J., House and Garage, which was constructed in 1900, and is significant for its architectural detail. It is on the list of National Register of Historic Places. Another popular historic site is the Wreck of the 1758 radeau LAND TORTOISE, a shipwreck site which occurred in 1758 of European-American origin. Other historic sites include:
 Chapman Historical Museum
 Marcella Sembrich Opera Museum
 Edward Eggleston Estate
 First Presbyterian Church of Glens Falls
 Fredella Street Historic District (Glens Falls)
 Three Squares Historic District (Glens Falls)
 The Hyde Collection(Glens Falls)
 Warrensburg Mills Historic District
 Wiawaka Bateaux Site
 Wiawaka Holiday House
 List of Historic Markers in Warren County

Communities

Larger Settlements

Towns

 Bolton
 Chester
 Hague
 Horicon
 Johnsburg
 Lake George
 Lake Luzerne
 Queensbury (county seat)
 Stony Creek
 Thurman
 Warrensburg

Hamlets

 Brant Lake
 East Lake George
 Kattskill Bay
 North River
 Oneida Corners
 Riparius
 Silver Bay
 Wevertown
 Pottersville

See also

 List of counties in New York
 National Register of Historic Places listings in Warren County, New York

References

Further reading

External links
  Official Warren County website
 
  Warren County, New York: Genealogy and History
 History of Warren County, edited by H. P. Smith - Chapter XVI: To the Present Time
  Early history of Warren County

 
Glens Falls metropolitan area
1813 establishments in New York (state)
Populated places established in 1813